The Finance Minister of Malta is the head of the Ministry for Finance.

Constitutional Functions

The Finance Minister has an important constitutional role. This constitution assigns the exclusive competence to the Finance Minister to initiate a legislative bill on financial measures. This means that financial measures cannot be introduced through a private member's bills amongst others. Furthermore, the constitution assigns the duty to the finance minister to lay before the House of Representatives not later than thirty days after, the commencement of each financial year estimates of the revenues and expenditure of Malta for that year.

See also

List of Finance Ministers of Malta